{{DISPLAYTITLE:Lutetium (177Lu) oxodotreotide}}

Lutetium (177Lu) oxodotreotide (INN) or 177Lu DOTA-TATE, trade name Lutathera, is a chelated complex of a radioisotope of the element lutetium with DOTA-TATE, used in peptide receptor radionuclide therapy (PRRT). Specifically, it is used in the treatment of cancers which express somatostatin receptors.

Alternatives to 177Lu-DOTATE include yttrium-90 DOTATATE or DOTATOC. The longer range of the beta particles emitted by 90Y, which deliver the therapeutic effect, may make it more suitable for large tumors with 177Lu reserved for smaller volumes

The U.S. Food and Drug Administration (FDA) considers 177Lu dotatate to be a first-in-class medication.

Clinical trials and drug approval 
The European Commission approved lutetium (177Lu) oxodotreotide (trade name Lutathera) "for the treatment of unresectable or metastatic, progressive, well differentiated (G1 and G2), somatostatin receptor positive gastroenteropancreatic neuroendocrine tumours (GEP-NETs) in adults" in September 2017.

177Lu DOTA-TATE was approved in the United States for the treatment of SSTR positive gastroenteropancreatic neuroendocrine tumors (GEP-NETs), including foregut, midgut and hindgut neuroendocrine tumors in adults, in January 2018. This was the first time a radiopharmaceutical had been approved for the treatment of GEP-NETs in the United States.

The U.S. Food and Drug Administration (FDA) approved 177Lu dotatate based primarily on evidence from one clinical trial, NETTER-1 of 229 participants with somatostatin-receptor positive midgut GEP-NETs. Enrolled participants had tumors which could not be surgically removed and were worsening while receiving treatment with octreotide.

Participants were randomly assigned to receive either 177Lu dotatate with long-acting octreotide or long-acting octreotide, at a higher dose, alone. 177Lu dotatate was injected through the vein and long-acting octreotide was injected in the muscle. Both, participants and health care providers knew which treatment was given. The benefit of 177Lu dotatate was evaluated by measuring the length of time that tumors did not grow after treatment and compared it to the control group (progression free survival).

The FDA considered additional data from a second study based on data from 1,214 participants with somatostatin receptor-positive tumors, including GEP-NETS, who received 177Lu dotatate at a single site in the Netherlands, Erasmus MC. All participants received 177Lu dotatate with octreotide. Participants and health care providers knew which treatment was given. The benefit of 177Lu dotatate was evaluated by measuring if and how much the tumor size changed during treatment (the overall response rate). Complete or partial tumor shrinkage was reported in 16 percent of a subset of 360 participants with GEP-NETs who were evaluated for response by the FDA. Participants initially enrolled in the study received 177Lu dotatate as part of an expanded access program.

The FDA granted the application for 177Lu dotatate priority review designation and orphan drug designation. The FDA granted the approval of Lutathera to Advanced Accelerator Applications.

Adverse effects
The therapeutic effect of 177Lu derives from the ionizing beta radiation it emits, however this can also be harmful to healthy tissue and organs. The kidneys are particularly at risk as they help to remove 177Lu DOTA-TATE from the body. To protect them, an amino acid solution (arginine/lysine) is administered by slow infusion, starting before the radioactive administration and normally continuing for several hours afterwards.

References

External links 
 

Chelating agents
Lutetium complexes
Macrocycles
Orphan drugs
Radiopharmaceuticals